The Sertig Valley is located in the municipality of Davos, south of the town, in the Swiss canton of Graubünden. It is a lateral valley of the Landwasser valley. The small village of Sertig Dörfli (at 1,861 m) is accessible by road.

External links
Sertig valley on Davos website
Sertig valley hiking

Valleys of Graubünden